State Route 37 (SR 37) is a  state highway that travels west-to-east through portions of Clay, Calhoun, Baker, Mitchell, Colquitt, Cook, Berrien, Lanier, and Clinch counties in the southwestern and south-central parts of the U.S. state of Georgia. The highway connects the Alabama state line west of Fort Gaines to the Homerville area, via Newton, Camilla, Moultrie, Adel, and Lakeland. The highway actually serves as the eastern terminus of a long multi-state route that starts in Mississippi and goes through Alabama.

Route description

Western terminus through Moultrie
SR 37 begins at the Alabama state line on the western edge of Fort Gaines, in Clay County, where the roadway continues to the west as Alabama State Route 10 (SR 10; Hartford Road) over the Chattahoochee River on the Henry G McKemie Memorial Bridge. In Fort Gaines is a very brief concurrency with SR 39. It continues to the east, to an intersection with US 27/SR 1 in Suttons Corner. Then, it cuts across a corner of Calhoun County and re-enters Clay County. At the unincorporated community of Jeff, the highway re-enters Calhoun County. Southwest of there, in Edison, is a brief concurrency with SR 216. It heads east and curves to the southeast to enter Morgan, where it has a short concurrency with SR 45. Continuing to the southeast, it crosses over Ichawaynochaway Creek, then passes McClendon Lake and enters Leary. In the city is an intersection with SR 55 and SR 62 (Mercer Avenue). At this intersection, SR 62 travels concurrent with SR 37 until it splits off onto Albany Highway. The highway heads east-southeast, curves to the south-southeast, and travels in a nearly-due south direction, before entering Baker County. SR 37 gradually curves to the south and bends to the south-southwest and meets the southern terminus of SR 216 (Blakely Highway). Then, it curves to the east-southeast, crosses over Chickasawhatchee Creek, and travels through Elmodel. Farther to the southeast, it intersects SR 200, just before entering Newton. In the city, it intersects SR 91. On the southeastern edge of the city, it crosses over the Flint River and enters Mitchell County. The highway travels through rural areas of the county and enters Camilla. There, it begins to curve to the east and meets the western terminus of SR 37 Conn. (West Oakland Avenue). A few blocks to the east is an intersection with SR 112 (Scott Street). Just over  later is US 19/SR 3/SR 300 (Georgia–Florida Parkway). A little farther to the east, SR 37 leaves town and runs through rural areas of the county to an intersection with SR 93. Just south of Mims Millpond, it enters Colquitt County. The highway travels through Hartsfield and Funston, until it enters Moultrie. There, it begins a concurrency with SR 111. Just over  later, they cross over the Ochlockonee River and travel along the Riverside–Moultrie city line. A short distance later, also on the city line, is the end of the concurrency, with SR 111 departing on West Bypass NW. SR 37 continues to travel along the city line until the intersection with 11th Street SW/Martin Luther King, Jr. Drive NW, where it re-enters Moultrie proper. In downtown Moultrie is an intersection with US 319 Bus./SR 33. Farther to the east, it crosses over Okapilco Creek and intersects US 319/SR 35/SR 133. There, SR 37 splits off to the northeast onto 4th Street NE.

East of Moultrie

Just south of Reed Bingham State Park, the highway crosses over the Little River into Cook County. It travels just to the south of Pervis Lake and then curves to the east-southeast and travels south of Giddens Pond. On the northwestern edge of Adel, it curves to the southeast and passes Cook County Airport. It then has an interchange with Interstate 75 (I-75) at exit 39. After that interchange, SR 37 curves to the east-northeast. Then, it intersects SR 76 (South Elm Street). The two highways continue into downtown Adel, where they intersect US 41/SR 7 (Hutchinson Avenue). Just before leaving the city, they curve to the east-southeast. Northeast of Cook High School, the two highways diverge, with SR 37 continuing to the east-southeast. Later, it curves to the southeast and crosses over the Withlacoochee River on the Shellie W. Parrish Memorial Bridge into Berrien County. After traveling through rural areas of the county, it curves to the east-northeast and enters Ray City. In the city, it intersects US 129/SR 11/SR 125. At this intersection, US 129/SR 11 join SR 37 in a concurrency to the east. Just before leaving town, the three highways meet the western terminus of SR 64 (Samuel Street). Immediately after that intersection, they curve to the southeast. Approximately  later, they enter Lanier County. After the county line, the concurrency begins to curve to a more easterly routing and travel north of Banks Lake. Just before entering Lakeland, they meet the northern terminus of SR 122 Conn. and cross over Mill Creek. Then, they enter the city and pass by Louis Smith Memorial Hospital. In downtown Lakeland are intersections with the western terminus of SR 11 Byp. (West Church Avenue) and the northern terminus of SR 11 Conn. (Pecan Street), before meeting SR 122 (West Main Street), which joins the concurrency. Approximately  later, they intersect US 221/SR 31/SR 135, which join the concurrency. Immediately, SR 135 departs to the north-northwest on North Carter Street. At Oak Street, SR 135 Byp. joins the concurrency. At North College Street, SR 135 Byp. leaves the concurrency to the north-northwest. This intersection also marks the eastern terminus of SR 11 Byp. The other six highways continue to the east-northeast, crossing over Big Creek before leaving the city. Then, they cross over the Alapaha River on the Capt. Henry Will Jones Bridge. After that, US 221/SR 31/SR 122 depart the concurrency to the north-northeast. Less than  later, they meet the western terminus of SR 37 Conn. Then, US 129/SR 11 leave the concurrency, while SR 37 continues to the east. The highway curves to the east-southeast and enters Clinch County. It crosses over Suwannoochee Creek on the Roger E. James Bridge and meets the eastern terminus of SR 168 (Nashville Highway). It continues to the east-southeast until it meets its eastern terminus, an intersection with US 84/SR 38, just southwest of Homerville.

National Highway System
The following portions of SR 37 are part of the National Highway System, a system of routes determined to be the most important for the nation's economy, mobility, and defense:
A very brief portion in Camilla, just west of US 19/SR 3/SR 300
Between SR 111 and US 319 Bus./SR 33 in Moultrie.

Major intersections

Special routes

Camilla connector route

State Route 37 Connector (SR 37 Conn.) is a  connector route that exists entirely within the city limits of Camilla, in the central part of Mitchell County. It is known as West Oakland Avenue for its entire length.

It begins at an intersection with the SR 37 mainline in the western part of Camilla. It heads northeast and curves to the east to meet its eastern terminus, an intersection with SR 112 (North Scott Street).

SR 37 Conn. is not part of the National Highway System, a system of roadways important to the nation's economy, defense, and mobility.

Camilla truck route

State Route 37 Truck (SR 37 Truck) is a truck route that exists entirely within the city limits of Camilla, in the central part of Mitchell County. It is known as West Oakland Avenue, as well as East Oakland Avenue and the Georgia–Florida Parkway.

The highway is concurrent with SR 37 Conn., SR 112, and US 19/SR 3.

Lanier County connector route

State Route 37 Connector (SR 37 Conn.) is a  connector route that exists entirely within the east-central part of Lanier County. It is located east of Lakeland.

It begins at an intersection with US 129/SR 11/SR 37. It heads southeast to meet its eastern terminus, an intersection with US 129/SR 11 and acts as a bypass of US 129/SR 11's intersection with SR 37. The road itself was originally part of US 129/SR 11 until 2009.

SR 37 Conn. is not part of the National Highway System, a system of roadways important to the nation's economy, defense, and mobility.

See also

References

External links

 
 Georgia Roads (Routes 21 - 40)
 Georgia Grown Trail 37

037
Transportation in Clay County, Georgia
Transportation in Calhoun County, Georgia
Transportation in Baker County, Georgia
Transportation in Mitchell County, Georgia
Transportation in Colquitt County, Georgia
Transportation in Cook County, Georgia
Transportation in Berrien County, Georgia
Transportation in Lanier County, Georgia
Transportation in Clinch County, Georgia